Pancytopenia is a medical condition in which there is significant reduction in the number of almost all blood cells (red blood cells, white blood cells, platelets, monocytes, lymphocytes, etc.).

If only two parameters from the complete blood count are low, the term bicytopenia can be used.  The diagnostic approach is the same as for pancytopenia.

Causes 
Iatrogenic causes of pancytopenia include chemotherapy for malignancies if the drug or drugs used cause bone marrow suppression. Rarely, drugs (antibiotics, blood pressure medication, heart medication) can cause pancytopenia.
For example, the antibiotic chloramphenicol can cause pancytopenia in some individuals.

Rarely, pancytopenia may have other causes, such as mononucleosis or other viral diseases. Increasingly, HIV is itself a cause of pancytopenia.
 Familial hemophagocytic syndrome
 Aplastic anemia
 Gaucher's disease
 Metastatic carcinoma of bone
 Multiple Myeloma
 Overwhelming infections
 Lymphoma
 Myelofibrosis
 Dyskeratosis congenita
 Myelodysplastic syndrome
 Leukemia
 Leishmaniasis
 Severe folate or vitamin B12 deficiency
 Systemic lupus erythematosus
 Paroxysmal nocturnal hemoglobinuria (blood test)
 Viral infections (such as HIV, EBV; an undetermined virus is most common)
 Alimentary toxic aleukia
 Copper deficiency
 Pernicious anemia
 Medication
 Hypersplenism
 Osteopetrosis
 Organic acidurias (Propionic Acidemia, Methylmalonic Aciduria, Isovaleric Aciduria)
 Low dose arsenic poisoning
 Sako disease (Myelodysplastic-cytosis)
 Chronic radiation sickness
 LIG4 syndrome

Mechanism
Common concept is pancytopenia can occur either due to mother cells are decreased themselves in number (aplastic anemia), mother cells are overwhelmed by malignant cells (Leukemia, lymphoma, MDS) or they are being sequestrated (spleen)/destroyed (immune) outside bone marrow. The mechanisms for pancytopenia differ according to the etiology. For example, in hemophagocytic lymphohistiocytosis (HLH) there is marked inappropriate and ineffective T cell activation that leads to an increased hemophagocytic activity. The T cell activated macrophages engulf erythrocytes, leukocytes, platelets, as well as their progenitor cells. Along with pancytopenia, HLH is characterized by fever, splenomegaly, and hemophagocytosis in bone marrow, liver, or lymph nodes.

Diagnosis 
Pancytopenia usually requires a bone marrow biopsy in order to distinguish among different causes.
 anemia: hemoglobin < 13.5 g/dL (male) or < 12 g/dL (female).
 leukopenia:  total white cell count < 4.0 x 109/L. Decrease in all types of white blood cells (revealed by doing a differential count).
 thrombocytopenia: platelet count < 150×109/L.

Treatment
Treatment is done to address the underlying cause. To tide over immediate crisis Blood transfusion with packed red blood cells (PRBC) or platelet transfusion may be done. Sometimes there are obvious clinical clues to suggest underlying B12 deficiency for a cause of  pancytopenia. In this selected cases even with severe anemia blood product transfusions can be avoided and vitamin B12 treatment itself suffice. In other situations like acute leukemia, Myelodysplastic syndrome, aplastic anemia etc. disease specific therapy is needed.

References

External links 
 EID Journal (Volume 6, Number 6), CDC, December 2000.

Blood disorders
Hematopathology